Dieter Herzog (born 15 July 1946 in  Oberhausen) is a former German international football player.

Herzog played more than 350 Bundesliga matches (69 goals) for Fortuna Düsseldorf and Bayer 04 Leverkusen in his professional career, after starting his senior career with Sportfreunde Hamborn 07 in a lower division and joining Düsseldorf a year before the club returned to the Bundesliga in 1971. He was part of the Düsseldorf team that ended third in the Bundesliga in 1972–73 and 1973–74, the season in which he made the biggest impact. In 1976 the left-sided winger joined Bayer 04 Leverkusen when the club was attempting to build a squad that could lead them all the way up to the Bundesliga. In fact, they succeeded and enabled Herzog to play four more season in the best German division then.

In the prime of his game in the years before the 1974 FIFA World Cup, Dieter Herzog was called up by Helmut Schön to represent West Germany five times in 1974. As he also came to action in the games against Yugoslavia and Sweden in the second round of the tournament, he played a part in the host nation winning the World Cup on that occasion.

Employed by Bayer 04 Leverkusen-sponsor Bayer after the end of his career, Dieter Herzog worked as a scout for his old club later on.

References

External links

1946 births
Living people
Sportspeople from Oberhausen
Footballers from North Rhine-Westphalia
German footballers
Germany international footballers
Germany B international footballers
Fortuna Düsseldorf players
Bayer 04 Leverkusen players
FIFA World Cup-winning players
1974 FIFA World Cup players
Bundesliga players
2. Bundesliga players
Sterkrade
Association football midfielders